Swett may refer to

Places in the United States 
 Swett, South Dakota, an unincorporated community in Bennett County
 Swett Ranch, Daggett County, Utah
 Swett-Ilsley House, Newbury, Massachusetts
 John Swett High School, Crockett, California

Other
 Swett (surname)